Bahramabad (also Romanized as Bahrāmābād) is a village in Jazireh Rural District, Ilkhchi District, Osku County, East Azerbaijan Province, Iran. At the 2006 census, its population was 75, in 21 families.

References 

Populated places in Osku County